Inland Territory is the fourth studio album by singer-songwriter Vienna Teng. It was released in Germany on February 6, 2009, and in the U.S. on April 7, 2009. The record was recorded over five months in four cities.

Track listing
All songs written by Vienna Teng (except "Antebellum", written by Vienna Teng and Alex Wong).
 "The Last Snowfall" – 3:24
 "White Light" – 4:12
 "Antebellum" – 4:43
 "Kansas" – 4:31
 "In Another Life" – 3:32
 "Grandmother Song" – 3:32
 "Stray Italian Greyhound" – 4:06
 "Augustine" – 3:13
 "No Gringo" – 5:23
 "Watershed" – 4:37
 "Radio" – 4:13
 "St. Stephen's Cross" – 5:07
 "Antebellum (acoustic version)" [included in bonus track version] – 4:41
 "White Light (acoustic version)" [Amazon.com exclusive for pre-order customers] – 3:07

References

2009 albums
Vienna Teng albums